Alexandra Joy Blackwell (born 31 August 1983) is a former professional cricketer who played for New South Wales and Australia as a specialist batter. In October 2017, she made her 250th international appearance for the Australian women's cricket team. In November 2019, she announced her retirement from cricket, after a career that spanned 18 years. Her identical twin sister Kate has also played for Australia.

Blackwell made her senior debut for New South Wales in the 2001–02 Women's National Cricket League (WNCL). Playing in the middle-order she had little to do as the opposition bowlers struggled to penetrate the New South Wales batting line-up. Blackwell made 33 runs at 33.00 in her debut season as New South Wales won the WNCL. The following season, she batted higher up the order and made 212 runs at 30.28, and was selected for the national team at the end of the season with a WNCL career total of only 245 runs. Making her international debut in 2002–03 in a quadrangular One Day International (ODI) tournament, she had few opportunities with the bat, scoring 54 runs at 27.00 but was unexpectedly successful with the ball, taking a total of 4/34 despite only having one previous wicket at senior level. She made her Test debut in a two-match series against England immediately afterwards, hitting a half-century in the latter fixture. Alex Blackwell is the 142nd woman to play Test cricket for Australia.

Over the next two years, Blackwell was inconsistent at international level and was in and out of the team due to poor performance. However, she was able to maintain her position for the 2005 World Cup in South Africa, playing in all but one match as Australia won the tournament without a loss. Playing in the middle-order, she was not required to bat often as the opposition rarely broke through the Australian batting, making 67 runs at 33.50. Her 53 against New Zealand was her first half-century in ODIs. However, Blackwell made only 48 from four Test innings during the subsequent tour of England and was unable to cement her place in the Australian team. Blackwell had a prolific 2005–06 WNCL season, scoring 411 runs including her maiden century, but was unable to translate her good domestic form into results for Australia, making only 83 runs in four innings against India at the end of the season.

After missing the first half of the 2006–07 season due to injury, Blackwell had a stint for Otago in New Zealand's State League, scoring 315 runs at 52.50. However, her international form remained poor and she was dropped midway through an ODI tournament in India after making 54 runs in four innings. She earned a recall midway through the subsequent Rose Bowl series against New Zealand. Blackwell established herself at international level in 2007–08. After making 291 runs at 41.57 in the WNCL, she broke through for her maiden ODI century in the home series against England. She made another fifty later in the series, followed by consecutive half-centuries against New Zealand, ending the international season with 389 runs at 43.22.

After playing in the Women's County Championship in England in 2008, Blackwell made 255 runs at 85.00 with a century and two fifties as Australia swept India 5–0 at home at the start of the 2008–09 season. She continued her strong form in the WNCL, scoring 372 runs at 62.00. Blackwell made consecutive fifties in the two warm-up matches and then scored 190 runs at 38.00 as Australia came fourth in the 2009 World Cup. She had a poor ODI tour of England, making single-figure scores in all five matches, before returning to Australia to score 489 runs at 61.12 in the WNCL, including two centuries, as New South Wales won for the fifth consecutive time, and making 191 runs at 47.75 in the T20 tournament.

Blackwell led Australia in the Rose Bowl series in early-2010 after regular captain Jodie Fields was sidelined due to injury. They won all eight ODIs but lost all five T20 internationals. Blackwell made 235 runs at 33.57 including two fifties.

In February 2018, she announced her retirement from international cricket, but would continue to play in the Women's Big Bash League. In November 2018, she was named in Sydney Thunder's squad for the 2018–19 Women's Big Bash League season.

Early years 

Blackwell was born in Wagga Wagga, but raised in Yenda, a small rural town outside of Griffith, New South Wales. She and her identical twin sister Kate attended Barker College on the North Shore of Sydney as boarders.

In March 2000, Blackwell was called into the New South Wales team for the under 17 interstate competition. In the first match, she took 3/7 and wasn't required to bat in a ten wicket victory over Victoria Blue. Her top-score for the tournament came in the sixth match against Western Australia, when she scored 57 not out. New South Wales won all of their eight matches to claim the competition and Blackwell ended with 149 runs at 37.25 and seven wickets at 17.00.

Domestic debut 

During the 2001–02 season, Blackwell made her senior debut for New South Wales. In her first match against Queensland, she bowled two expensive overs, conceding 18 runs, and was not required to bat as New South Wales won by six wickets. Batting in the middle-order, often lower than the top-six, Blackwell as only required to bat once in her first four matches, making nine not out in the second match against Queensland and being at the crease when the six-wicket win was registered. The season was interrupted by the national Under-19 competition, and Blackwell was prominent with both bat and ball as New South Wales won all of their six matches. Apart from one duck, Blackwell reached 30 in her remaining five innings to aggregate 207 runs at 41.40. She also took 11 wickets at 9.36. In five of the six matches, she scored at least 30 and took two or more wickets. Blackwell returned to senior duty and again had little to do in the lower order as her state's leading batter encountered little difficulty with opposition bowlers. New South Wales defeated Victoria in both round-robin matches and beat them again in the finals series 2–0 to win their sixth consecutive national title. Blackwell was at the crease, unbeaten on 12, as New South Wales reached their target in the second match with four wickets in hand, having not been required to bat in the seven-wicket win in the first final the day before. Blackwell played in eight matches but was only required to bat four times for a total of 33 runs at 33.00 and bowled seven overs without success.

At the end of the season, Blackwell was selected for the Australia Youth team that played New Zealand A. She made 76 runs at 19.00 in four matches with a highest score of 32 and took a total of 1/43 from 11 overs. This was followed by a match against the senior New Zealand team. Blackwell took 1/18 and scored 2 in a 21-run defeat.

In 2002–03, Blackwell played in her first full season in the WNCL, taking to the field in all 10 of New South Wales' matches. After not being trusted to bat at No. 7 or higher in the first match of the season, which New South Wales won, Blackwell was unbeaten on 17 when they lost to South Australia in the second match of the double-header the next day, having been attacked and conceded 23 runs from two overs in South Australia's innings. Blackwell made her maiden half-century at senior level in the next match, scoring 74 not out to guide her state of a five-wicket win over Victoria. She then made three single-digit scores before rediscovering form in the last two round-robin matches against Western Australia, making 36 and 38. New South Wales won six matches of their eight matches and faced Victoria in the final. Blackwell made only 14 and 17 as New South Wales lost both of the finals, ending their run of six WNCL titles in a row. In the second final, she took her maiden wicket at senior level, but her sporadic bowling was otherwise unsuccessful, conceding 45 runs in 8 overs for the season. Blackwell ended the season with 212 runs at 30.28.

International career

International debut 

At the end of the season, Blackwell was called into the national team for a quadrangular ODI tournament held in Lincoln in New Zealand. In addition to the hosts and Australia, England and India were also competing. Each team played two matches against the other three teams in the round-robin phase. Blackwell made her debut in Australia's second match, against England, but neither batted nor bowled in a seven-wicket win. In the next match, against India, she scored 27 before being run out and had unexpected success as a bowler, taking 2/8 from six overs in a 59-run win. She was left out of Australia's fourth match, against England, but returned for the last two qualifying matches. She took 2/18 against India before making six not out as the winning runs were scored against the hosts. In the final, she made 21 as Australia scored 214 and defeated the hosts by 109 runs. Blackwell ended her first international series with 54 runs at 27.00 and four wickets at 8.50 at an economy rate of 2.61.  The success with the ball is something she has not repeated. In seven years since, she had only taken two more wickets at international level. Alex Blackwell is the 97th woman to play One Day International cricket for Australia.

Australia then hosted England in two Tests. Blackwell made her debut at the Gabba in Brisbane. In a low-scoring match, she bowled 11 overs including six maidens, registering figures of 0/9 as the tourists made 124 batting first. Blackwell then came in at 4/40 and made four from 14 balls in her maiden Test innings before being dismissed by Laura Newton, precipitating a collapse of 6/28 as Australia fell to be all out for 78. After England was all out for 92, Blackwell came to the crease with the score at 4/104, with 35 runs still needed for victory. She and Michelle Goszko batted slowly, adding seven runs in nine overs before the latter was out. Blackwell was then joined by Julie Hayes, who scored 18 of the remaining 28 runs required for victory. Blackwell was nine not out and was at the crease when the winning runs were registered with five wickets in hand, having batted for 85 balls in 85 minutes. Despite her circumspect batting, Blackwell was retained for the Second Test at Bankstown Oval in Sydney. Australia batted first and Blackwell came in at 4/90. Soon after, her partners Mel Jones and Hayes fell in quick succession as Australia lost 3/13 to be 6/103. Blackwell then added 21 with Cathryn Fitzpatrick before the former was out for 13; this triggered a collapse of 4/10 as Australia were all out for 134. Blackwell came in at 4/49 with Australia still four runs behind in the second innings. She added 136 in 226 minutes for the fifth wicket with Lisa Sthalekar before being dismissed for 58, having hit six boundaries from 236 balls. In pursuit of a target of 206, England reached 6/133 when time ran out. Blackwell did not bowl in the match.

Blackwell played in all of New South Wales' 11 matches in the 2003–04 WNCL, scoring 183 runs at 26.14. In the fourth match of the season against South Australia, she made an unbeaten 70 in a vain attempt to secure victory in the run-chase as her state were bowled out and fell to a ten-run defeat. She was then run out twice for 26 and 23 in the two matches against reigning champions Victoria, as New South Wales tied one match and lost the next by four wickets. It was two of three instances in which Blackwell was run out during the season. New South Wales had a chance for redemption in the finals against Victoria. Blackwell made a duck—her third single-digit score in as many matches—in the first final, which the titleholders won by six wickets. In the next two matches, she was unbeaten on 13 and 16 and at the crease when the winning runs were brought up. New South Wales won the second final by five wickets and scraped home in the deciding match by three wickets to regain the WNCL title. Blackwell's sporadic bowling—26 overs in total—yielded one wicket at 118.00 at an economy rate of 4.37.

Inconsistency at international level 
Blackwell retained her position in the national team for the Rose Bowl series, which consisted of three matches each in New Zealand and then Australia. She played in only the third match in New Zealand and did not bat in the seven-wicket win, before being omitted for the first match at home. She was recalled for the second match and made 15 not out in a 40-run win, before her unbeaten 22 guided Australia to a four-wicket win in the final match at Bellerive Oval, as the hosts took out the series 5–1.

In the first four matches of the 2004–05 WNCL, Blackwell made 54 and 27 in her only innings as the opposition bowlers failed to penetrate the New South Wales top-order in the other two matches. The defending champions won all four matches before the season was adjourned when the national team travelled to India in December for seven-match bilateral ODI series. Blackwell scored two in a 14-run win in the opening match in Mysore and was dropped for the next match. She was recalled for the third match in Mumbai, run out for a duck in a six-wicket defeat. The tourists won the next two matches to seal the series, but Blackwell was not prominent. She was not required to bat in the third match and was run out for 13 in the next. She made 19 in the sixth ODI and was dropped for the final match of the tour, ending the series with 34 runs at 8.50.

2005 World Cup 

Blackwell returned to Australia needing a strong end to the WNCL season to ensure selection for the 2005 World Cup in South Africa. In the four remaining round-robin matches, she made 96 runs in four innings, half of these coming in a five-wicket win over Queensland. New South Wales met Victoria in the finals. Blackwell was not required to bat in a seven-wicket win in the first match before making 13 and 24 as the reigning champions were dismissed for 71 and 109, losing the last two matches by five wickets and 50 runs respectively. Blackwell ended the season with 214 runs at 26.75 and this was enough to secure retention in the national team despite her poor results during the Indian tour. The Australians hosted New Zealand for three Rose Bowl ODIs in the western coastal city of Perth before the teams crossed the Indian Ocean to reach South Africa. Blackwell was not productive in the trans-Tasman matches. She made six and took 1/8 in the first match, and was then run out for 27 in the next game. She was omitted for third match.

In the first match of the World Cup, Blackwell was persevered with by the selectors; she did not bat as England made 7/169 before rain ended the match. This was followed by an encounter with New Zealand. Blackwell scored 53 in Australia's 7/174, helping to set up a 32-run win. In the third match against the West Indies, she was run out for a duck in a 79-run win, and was dropped for the 97-run win over the hosts. The group stages ended with two easy victories. Blackwell took 1/8 from two overs, her last international wicket, as Australia dismissed Sri Lanka for 57. Since then she has bowled only 47 balls in senior matches. She was not required to bat as Australia reached their target with eight wickets in hand. The match against Ireland was similar as Australia achieved the target of 67 with all wickets intact. The final pool match against India was abandoned without a ball being bowled due to inclement weather, and Australia met England in the semi-finals. Blackwell scored 10 not out, helping to complete the closing stages of a five-wicket win. In the final against India, she came in towards the end of the innings and made four not out as Australia amassed 4/215. Australia bowled India out for 117 to win by 98 runs. Blackwell ended the tournament with 67 runs at 33.50.

In the northern hemisphere summer of 2005, Australia toured England. They started with a stopover in Ireland, and only the second of the three ODIs went ahead; the other two matches were washed out by persistent rain. Blackwell made four not out as Australia made 3/295 and took a 240-run win.

Australia played two Tests in England. In the First Test at County Ground in Hove, Sussex, Blackwell batted at No. 5 and played alongside identical twin sister Kate, who was making her Test debut. She struggled in both innings, making five and nine and scoring at a strike rate of 20 or less in both innings. After taking an 82-run lead, Australia set the hosts a target of 306. Blackwell took two catches, her first at Test level, removing Claire Taylor and Jenny Gunn as the hosts ended on 7/172 to salvage a draw. In the Second Test at New Road, Worcester, Blackwell made 20 and 14 as Australia ceded a 158-run first innings lead and eventually lost by six wickets after Blackwell's fall in the second innings left them at 5/46, still 112 runs in arrears. She ended the series with 48 runs at 12.00.

Blackwell had mediocre results in the five ODIs, scoring 5, 27, 17 not out, 21 not out and 14 as Australia won 3–2. She ended the series with 84 runs at 28.00. Blackwell then played in Australia's inaugural Twenty20 international at the County Ground, Taunton, only the second international match in the history of the new format. She was not required to bat as Australia won with seven wickets in hand.

Having failed to establish herself at international level in 2005, Blackwell started the 2005–06 WNCL season strongly, scoring 61 in the first match of the campaign, a seven-wicket win over Western Australia. The next day she made 130, her maiden WNCL century, setting up a 118-run win against the same team. She then top-scored with 86 in the next match against Queensland, scoring more than half of the runs in a successful run-chase of 3/161. After a run of three scores of 10 or less, Blackwell made 36 and 30 as New South Wales won both matches against Victoria in their last double-header of the season. New South Wales won seven of their eight matches to qualify for the finals against Queensland. In the first match, she scored 50 as New South Wales reached their target of 175 with eight wickets in hand, having earlier taken two catches. She made only three in the next match as New South Wales fell for 154 and lost by three wickets, before scoring 10 as her state made 146 and won by two runs to claim the WNCL. Blackwell ended the season with 411 runs at 38.36.

After her strong WNCL season, Blackwell was retained for the series against India in Adelaide at the end of the Australian summer. Opening the batting, she made a 17-ball duck in the one-off Test at the Adelaide Oval, which Australia won by an innings. Blackwell took three catches but made only one in the first ODI. She only made 19 in the next match but was retained for the third and final ODI, top-scoring with an unbeaten 63 in a nine-wicket win. She ended the series with 83 runs at 41.50.

Blackwell missed the five-ODI Rose Bowl series at home and the first four WNCL matches of the 2006–07 season due to injury. She returned for the final four round-robin matches and made 42, 17, 74 and 4 as New South Wales won all four matches. She was not effective in the three finals against Victoria, making a duck in a one-wicket win in the first match before scoring one as Victoria levelled the series with an eight-wicket triumph the following day. In the deciding match, she made 20 as New South Wales reached their target of 206 with three wickets in hand. Blackwell ended the season with 158 runs at 22.57.

During gaps in New South Wales' schedule, Blackwell travelled across to New Zealand for three weekends of domestic one-dayers for Otago. In her debut for the team, she struck an even 100 in a 162-run win over Northern Districts. She added 79 in a 182-run victory the following day. After making 27 and 31 against Auckland, Blackwell ended her stay with 1 and 77 against Canterbury; Otago lost both matches. She ended with 315 runs at 52.50 in her six-match stint.

After the end of the Australian season, Blackwell was selected for the ODI team for a four-nations tournament in Chennai, India. In addition to the hosts and Australia, New Zealand and England were also participating, and each team played each other twice in round-robin phase. In the first match, she made 25 in a six-wicket defeat against New Zealand, who took 41 runs without loss from her four overs en route to a six-wicket win. Blackwell then made 11 in a three-wicket loss to the hosts, leaving Australia in danger of missing the final. She was retained but made a duck and 18 as Australia won their next two matches against England and New Zealand. Blackwell was then omitted from the two remaining round-robin matches and the final, which Australia won by six wickets. She ended the tournament with 54 runs at 13.50.

Blackwell was retained in the Rose Bowl series held in tropical Darwin in July 2007, the middle of the southern hemisphere winter. After watching the first two matches from the sidelines, she was called into the team for the third match where she made an unbeaten 44 to see Australia to a six-wicket win. She made 4 and 27 in the two remaining matches, ending the series with 75 runs at 37.50 as Australia prevailed 3–2.

Blackwell started the 2007–08 WNCL season strongly, scoring half-centuries in each of the first four matches, all of which were won by New South Wales. She made 75 not out and 52 against South Australia, followed by 60 and 55 against Victoria. The results in each of the two double-headers were identical; New South Wales won the first match by seven wickets before prevailing the next day by 25 runs. Blackwell made 42 in the penultimate round-robin match but otherwise failed to reach double figures in the last four matches. New South Wales qualified in first place for the final against South Australia after winning seven of their eight matches and were awarded the title after the decider was washed out. Blackwell scored 291 runs at 41.57. In her only T20 innings, Blackwell made 37 not out in an eight-wicket win over Western Australia.

Established international cricketer 
The domestic competition was followed by two international series against England and New Zealand. Blackwell made 10 as Australia won the T20 international against England at the Melbourne Cricket Ground by 21 runs. In the ODIs that followed, drawn 2–2, Blackwell established herself at international level. After scoring 11 in an Australian defeat in the first ODI, she struck 101—her maiden ODI century—the next day at the MCG to set up an 84-run win. After making five as England took a 2–1 series lead, Blackwell made 61 in the final match to help set up a series-levelling 41-run win. She ended the series with 178 runs at 44.50. In the one-off Test at Bowral, Blackwell opened the innings. She made one as Australia batted first and reached 154 in their first innings before conceding a 90-run first innings lead. In the second innings, she made 24 before being bowled for the second time in the matches by pace bowler Isa Guha as the tourists won by six wickets in hand.

The Australians then headed to Bert Sutcliffe Oval in Lincoln, New Zealand, for a T20 international and five ODIs. Blackwell made 15 and took two catches as the hosts won the T20 by four wickets. She then made 44 of 5/189 to help secure a 63-run win in the first ODI. In the next two matches, she made seven twice, as the hosts claimed both matches to take the series lead. Australia thus needed to win the remaining two matches. In the fourth match, Blackwell made 61 in an Australian win by six runs. In the final match, she made 91 to help steer Australia to their target of 250 and a series-clinching eight-wicket win. Blackwell ended the series with 211 runs at 42.20. For the whole international season, she scored 389 runs at 43.22 to establish herself at international level.

During the 2008 Australian winter, Blackwell travelled to England for a domestic season in the northern hemisphere summer, playing for Berkshire in the county competition, and Rubies in the Super Fours. Blackwell failed to capitalise on her starts for the county, registering scores of 41, 22, 0, 39 and 30 in her five one-day innings for a total of 132 runs at 26.40. It was a similar story in four one-dayers for Rubies, making 58 runs at 14.50 with a best of 26. Blackwell had little impact in the T20s for Rubies, making four and a duck.

The 2008–09 Australian season started with a tour by India. Blackwell started with 0/14 from her only over and scored 14 in a six-wicket win in the T20 match. She was prominent as the hosts completed a 5–0 clean sweep of the ODIs. In the first match at Hurstville Oval, she made 75 in an eight-wicket win. After making eight and one not out in the next two matches, Blackwell made 106 not out, setting up a 118-run win in the fourth match at Manuka Oval. She ended the series with 65 run out in the seven-wicket win in the final match. Blackwell aggregated 255 runs at 85.00 for the series.

Blackwell had a slow start to the WNCL, failing to pass 22 in her first three innings; she made an unbeaten 50 in an eight-wicket win over Western Australia, and then struck an unbeaten 101 as New South Wales made 1/176 to defeat South Australia by nine wickets. The next day, she made 75 but it was not enough to prevent a 39-run loss against the same team. In the two final round-robin matches against Victoria, she made 70 not out in a nine-wicket win, her fourth consecutive score above 50. The streak ended with 22 in a three-wicket win the next day, and New South Wales hosted the final the following week against the same team. Blackwell made only three as New South Wales made 4/120 to win by six wickets. She ended the season with 372 runs at 62.00.

2009 World Cup and World Twenty20 
After the WNCL ended, the Australians headed to New Zealand for the Rose Bowl series. Blackwell made 10 and 9 in the first two matches as Australia went 2–0 down. She then made 59 and 37 in the next two matches as Australia levelled the series; the fifth and final match was washed out. The teams returned to Australia for the World Cup. In two warm-up matches against England and Sri Lanka, Blackwell made 91 not out and 56 retired; Australia won the matches by 25 and 230 runs respectively.

In the opening match of the World Cup campaign, Blackwell made four as Australia fell short of their target on the Duckworth-Lewis method. Australia then needed to win their two remaining group matches to reach the Super Six phase. Blackwell made 22 and took three catches as Australia defeated South Africa by 61 runs. She then scored 46 not out in a 47-run win over the West Indies. In the first Super Six match, against India, Blackwell scored 54 as Australia made 7/218, falling 17 runs of their target. She then made seven run out in the win over Pakistan by 107 runs. She made 38 not out in Australia's final Super Six match against England, and although the hosts won by eight wickets, it was not enough for them to place in the top two in the standings and qualify for the final. In the third-place playoff against India, Blackwell made 19 in a three-wicket defeat. 
Blackwell ended the tournament with 190 runs at 38.00.

Blackwell was selected for Australia's team for the inaugural Women's World Twenty20 held in England in 2009. The Australians hosted New Zealand for a three-match series in tropical Darwin at the beginning of June before the World Cup, and Blackwell played in all the matches, making 11 not out and 10 in her two innings. Australia took the series 2–1.

After arriving in England, Blackwell made 19 in Australia's 8/123, which New Zealand surpassed with nine wickets in hand. She was not required to bat in an eight-wicket win over the West Indies. Blackwell then 40 not out as Australia defeated South Africa by 24 runs.

This put Australia into the semi-final against England. Blackwell made five before England overhauled Australia's score  of 5/163 to reach the final, which they won. She ended the tournament with 64 runs at 32.00.

Blackwell and the Australians stayed in England for a bilateral series against the hosts, who were the reigning world champions in both ODIs and T20s, after the end of the World Twenty20. In the one-off T20 match, she made 18 as Australia upset England by 34 runs. She played in all five ODIs, and had a torrid time against the English bowling, scoring 7, 3, 0, 0 and 5. She started with a 38-ball 7 in Chelmsford and had a series of slow-scoring single-digit innings, ending the series with a strike rate of 19.73.

England won all the ODI matches except the last, which was washed out. Blackwell played in the one-off Test match at County Road in Worcestershire. Blackwell opened and made a fourth-ball duck as Australia fell to 5/28 in their first innings before recovering to make 309. After the tourists had taken a 41-run lead, Blackwell made 68 as Australia made 231 to set the hosts a target of 273. Blackwell and opening partner Nitschke put on 49 before the latter was out for 25. Blackwell then added 81 in 21 overs with Rolton before the latter was dismissed, leaving the score at 2/130. She was then out at 3/150 after hitting six fours and a six from 135 balls, sparking a collapse of 8/81. The match was drawn as the hosts ended at 3/106.

Heavy WNCL scoring and national captaincy 

After making single-figure scores in consecutive matches, Blackwell struck an unbeaten 121, scoring more than half the runs in an eight-wicket win over the Australian Capital Territory in the third match of the season. After making 37 and 39 in the pair of matches against Victoria, she was prominent in the double-header against Western Australia, scoring 138 to set up a 127-run win, before making an unbeaten 61 the next day in a ten-wicket win. In the final, Blackwell top-scored with 54 as New South Wales batted first and made 9/206. They then dismissed the Victorians for 147 to seal a 59-run win. Blackwell ended the WNCL with 489 runs at 61.12.

A T20 domestic tournament was introduced, and Blackwell was prolific in the six qualifying matches, scoring 31 not out, 32, 30, 41, 33 not out and 24 not out. New South Wales won all of the round-robin matches except the fixture against Victoria. The two teams met again in the final, and Blackwell failed for the only time in the competition, making a duck as New South Wales fell for 75 in pursuit of 128 for victory.

After the series, Blackwell led Australia in the Rose Bowl series against New Zealand due to an injury to incumbent captain Jodie Fields. The campaign started with five ODIs in Australia. In the first two matches, held at the Adelaide Oval, she made 51 and 34 as the hosts won by 115 runs and six wickets respectively. The last three matches of the series were held at the Junction Oval in Melbourne. In the third ODI, Blackwell top-scored with 92 as Australia took a 102-run win and sealed the series. She was not required to bat in the ten-wicket win in fourth match and made one as Australia took a 5–0 whitewash with a comfortable 103-run win in the final ODI. Blackwell ended her first series as captain with 178 runs at 44.50.

The ODIs were followed by three T20s at Bellerive Oval in Hobart and two more in New Zealand at the start of the second phase of the bilateral contests. Blackwell played in every match and Australia was whitewashed. The three matches in Hobart were closely fought; Blackwell made 11, top-scored with 40, and added 26 as New Zealand won by two, one and seven runs respectively. The hosts won the last two matches in New Zealand convincingly by 59 and 17 runs; Blackwell made 9 and 8 as the Australians were bowled out for 73 and 98. She ended the series with 94 runs at 18.80.

Australia then swept New Zealand 3–0 in the ODIs in New Zealand. In the first match, Blackwell made five as Australia came closest to defeat in the ODIs, scraping home by two wickets. She made 8 and 44 in last two matches in Invercargill to complete the clean sweep. In all the ODIs she made 235 runs at 33.57. Blackwell had thus led Australia to eight consecutive ODI wins over New Zealand.

2010 World Twenty20 triumph 
Blackwell led the team at the 2010 World Twenty20 in the West Indies and captained in every match after Fields was again forced out by injury. She batted at No. 4 in all but one match. In the first warm-up match against New Zealand, she opened the bowling with her occasional medium pace, and took 1/29 from her four overs, dismissing the opposing captain and opener Aimee Watkins. She then came in at No. 4 and top-scored with 44 from as many balls as Australia lost by 18 runs. In the last warm-up match, she made 35 not out from 21 balls and featured in a 55-run partnership from 40 balls with Jess Cameron. She did not bowl herself as the Australians defeated Pakistan by 82 runs.

Australia were grouped with defending champions England, South Africa and the West Indies. In the first match against England, Blackwell ran out Holly Colvin to end the innings with 15 balls unused. In pursuit of 105 for victory, Australia were 2/10 when Blackwell came to the crease. She made 7 from 14 balls in a partnership of 34 from 33 balls—Australia's largest of the match—with Leah Poulton. However, their dismissals in consecutive overs started a collapse of 5/19 from 34 balls. However, Australia recovered, and Rene Farrell was run out going for the winning run from the third last ball available, leaving the scores tied.

A Super Over eventuated, and both teams ended with 2/6 after both suffered run outs in an attempt to secure a seventh run on the final ball. Australia was awarded the match because they had hit more sixes in the match—Jess Cameron scored the solitary six.

In the next match against South Africa, Blackwell made 9 from 14 balls, the only Australian in the first seven batting positions to score at less than a strike rate of 133.33. A sudden collapse saw Australia lose 6/16 including the last four wickets for four runs to be all out for 155 with three balls unused. They eventually completed a 22-run win. In the final group match, Blackwell top-scored with 28 from 26 balls, and batted through most of the innings, although she only faced a small minority of the 74 balls delivered during her time at the crease, as Australia finished on 7/133. She had put on 22 runs in 16 balls with Sthalekar. She caught Shanel Daley from the bowling of Sthalekar as Australia won by nine runs to finish the group stage unbeaten at the top of their quartet.

Australia went on to face India in the semi-final. Blackwell ran out opposing captain and all rounder Jhulan Goswami, one of three wickets to fall in the 17th over bowled by Ellyse Perry. Australia were set a target of 120, and Blackwell promoted herself to No. 3 after opener Elyse Villani fell for a duck in the first over. Blackwell and Nitschke counter-attacked, and scored the next 50 runs in 40 balls, before Nitschke was out to end a stand of 74 runs in 60 balls. Blackwell reached her fifty in 37 balls and was eventually out for 61 from 49 balls with 17 runs still required from 28 balls for victory. The Australians reached their target with seven wickets and seven balls to spare, and Blackwell was named the player of the match.

In the final against New Zealand, Blackwell elected to bat, but New Zealand started more effectively. Nitschke and Villani were out in consecutive overs and Blackwell came in at 2/14 in the fourth over. After being unable to score from her first six balls, Blackwell was then dismissed for a duck from her seventh delivery, cutting Nicola Browne into the hands of Sophie Devine in the gully, leaving the score at 3/20 in the sixth over. The Australians eventually reached 8/106 from their 20 overs.

New Zealand started their chase solidly, but in the fourth over, the tide began to turn when but their captain Aimee Watkins pulled Clea Smith and the catch was taken by a leaping Blackwell at midwicket. In the next over Blackwell ran out Sara McGlashan for 1, after the latter had been in a mix-up with Suzie Bates, leaving New Zealand at 2/19. Later, Blackwell caught Rachel Priest from Nitschke to leave New Zealand at 5/36 after 11 overs, leaving them with 71 runs to score from the last 54 balls. Australia went on to win by three runs.

2015 Ashes
In June 2015, she was named as one of Australia's touring party for the 2015 Women's Ashes in England.

2017–18 season

Blackwell was in Australia's squad for the Women's Ashes. In the first WODI of the series she came to the crease when Australia were 4/87, still requiring 144 runs for victory. She batted for the rest of the innings, getting to a total of 67 and steering Australia to victory in the final over of the match. In the third WODI of the series, she played in her 250th international match for Australia Women.

Retirement
In February 2018, Blackwell announced her retirement from international and state career. She featured in 251 matches across all three formats in a career spanning for 15 years. She has written that she sees herself as having been a "good international cricketer", but not a "great" one. She also does not think that she can make a judgement as to whether she was a good leader; "... only my peers can." However, she also feels that she had been her "true self", had spoken up, with respect, to others in the cricketing community in seeking continual improvement, and had "... kept on trying to be the best leader [she] could."

One Day International centuries
In her 251 international matches, Blackwell scored three centuries, all of them in ODIs. During the first two of those centuries, both made in 2008, her twin sister Kate was "up the other end". Her third ODI hundred, and highest international score, came just over seven years later, in 2016. It was against India, the same opposing team as for her second ODI century, and at the same venue, Manuka Oval in Canberra, where, as she later wrote, she "... always batted well."

Personal life
Blackwell's nickname is "Seal". She has explained that the origin of the nickname is "... a story which involves the misquoting of lyrics from the Go Go's song 'our lips are sealed'."

In 2013, Blackwell came out as lesbian, the second international player to come out during their playing career after England's Steven Davies. Her wife is fellow cricketer Lynsey Askew.

See also 
 List of centuries in women's One Day International cricket

References

External links

Speak up if you want change, says this cricket legend – interview of Blackwell by the Australian Financial Review
The leadership and gentleness of Alex Blackwell – podcast of interview by Richard Fidler, Conversations, ABC Radio, 3 October 2022

1983 births
Australia women One Day International cricketers
Australia women Test cricketers
Australia women Twenty20 International cricketers
Australian expatriate sportspeople in England
Berkshire women cricketers
Cricketers from New South Wales
Identical twins
Lesbian sportswomen
Australian LGBT sportspeople
Living people
New South Wales Breakers cricketers
Otago Sparks cricketers
People educated at Barker College
Sportspeople from Wagga Wagga
Sydney Thunder (WBBL) cricketers
Australian twins
Twin sportspeople
Yorkshire Diamonds cricketers
LGBT cricketers
Female cricket coaches
21st-century Australian LGBT people
Wicket-keepers